John Thomas Devereux (died 31 December 1885) was an Irish Whig, Independent Irish Party and Repeal Association politician.

Devereux was elected as Repeal Association Member of Parliament (MP) for Wexford Borough at the 1847 general election and, becoming an Independent Irish Party MP in 1852 and then a Whig in 1857, held the seat until 1859 when he did not seek re-election.
His younger brother Richard Joseph Devereux was elected MP for Wexford Borough in 1865.

References

External links
 

UK MPs 1847–1852
UK MPs 1852–1857
UK MPs 1857–1859
Irish Repeal Association MPs
Whig (British political party) MPs for Irish constituencies
Irish Nationalist politicians
1885 deaths
Members of the Parliament of the United Kingdom for County Wexford constituencies (1801–1922)